This is a list of philosophers and scholars working in the Christian tradition in Western Europe during the medieval period, including the early Middle Ages. See also scholasticism.''



A 
Abélard, Pierre, (1079–1142)
Adam de Wodeham
Adam de Buckfield
Adam Parvipontanus
Adam Pulchrae Mulieris/Adam de Puteorumvilla
Adelard of Bath
Adrian of Canterbury, (or Hadrian, died 710)
Ailred of Rievaulx
Æthelbert of York, (sometimes Æthelberht, Albert, Ælberht, Aethelberht, or Ælbert; died 780)
Alain, bishop of Auxerre
Alain de Lille / Alanus de Insulis / Montepessulano, (c. 1128–1202)
Albert of Saxony
Albric of London
Alberich of Reims
Albert of Saxony, (1316–1390)
Albertus Magnus
Alcuin of York, (c. 735–804)
Aldhelm of Malmesbury, (c. 639–709)
Alexander of Hales, (died 1245)
Alexander Nequam/Neckam/of St Alban's
Alfred of Sareshel/Alfredus Anglicus
Alphonsus Maria de Liguori
Amalric of Bena/Bène, (died c. 1204–1207)
Anselm of Laon, (died 1117)
Anselm of Canterbury, (1034–1109)
Ardengus
Arnaldus de Villanova

B 
Bartholomaeus Arnoldi von Usingen
Bartholomew of Bologna
Bede, (672/673–735)
Benedict of Nursia
Bernard of Chartres
Bernard of Clairvaux, (1090–1153)
Bernard Silvestris
Bero Magni de Ludosia
Berthold of Moosburg
Boetius of Dacia
Bonaventure
Burgundio of Pisa
Byrhtferth of Ramsey

C 
Cesare Cremonini, (1550–1631); alias Caesar Cremoninus
Clarembald of Arras
Cuthbert Tunstall

D 
Daniel of Morley
Dante Alighieri, (1265–1321)
David Cranston
David of Dinant
Denys the Carthusian
Domingo Bañez
Domingo de Soto
Dominicus Gundissalinus
(John) Duns Scotus, (c. 1266–1308)
Durand of St Pourçain

E 
Ecgbert of York, (or Egbert, died 766)
Meister Eckhart
Edmund of Abingdon
Elias Burneti of Bergerac
Everard of Ypres

F 
Francis of Marchia
Francis of Meyronnes
Francisco Suárez, (1548–1617)

G 
Gabriel Biel
Gaetano of Thiene
Garlandus Compotista
Gaunilo(n) of Montmoutiers
Gerard of Abbeville
Gerard of Cremona
Gerho of Reichersberg
Gersonides, (1288–1344)
Gilbert of Poitiers
Giles of Rome
Giovanni Girolamo Saccheri
Girolamo Savonarola
Gonsalvo of Spain
Guerric of Saint-Quentin
Godfrey of Fontaines
Pope Gregory I
Gregory of Rimini
Guido Terrena

H 
Heinrich Totting von Oytha
Henry Aristippus
Henry Bate
Henry of Ghent
Henry of Harclay
Henry of Langenstein
Hermann of Carinthia
Hervaeus Natalis
Heymeric of Camp
Honorius Augustodunensis/*Honoré d'Autun (1080–1154)
Hugh of St. Cher
Hugh of St. Victor

I 
Ivo of Chartres

J 
James of Metz
James of Venice
James of Viterbo
Jacques de Vitry
Jan Standonck
Jean Buridan,  (c. 1295–1363)
Jean de la Rochelle
Jerome of Prague
Joachim of Flora
Jocelin, Bishop of Soissons
Jodocus Trutfetter
Johann Eck
Johann von Goch
Johann Ruchrat von Wesel
John Baconthorpe
John Blund
John Cantius
John Capreolus
John Dumbleton
John Fisher
John Gerson, (1363–1429)
John Halgren of Abbeville
John of Jandun
John Mair
John of Mirecourt
John Pagus
John of Paris
John Peckham
John Poinsot
John Punch
John of Reading
John of Salisbury, (c. 1115–1180)
Johannes Scotus Eriugena
John of Seville
John Wyclif, (born 1324)
Juan Caramuel y Lobkowitz
Juan de Mariana

L 
Luis de Molina
Lupus Servatus (also known as Servatus Lupus) (c. 805–c. 862)

M 
Manegold of Lautenbach
Marsilius of Inghen
Marsilius of Padua
Martin of Dacia
Matthew of Aquasparta
Mechthild of Magdeburg (c. 1207–c. 1282/1294)
Melchior Cano
Michael of Massa

N 
Nicholas of Amiens
Nicholas of Autrecourt
Nicholas of Cusa
Nicole Oresme

O 
Odo of Châteauroux

P 
Paul of Pergula
Paul of Venice
Peter Abelard, (1079–1142)
Peter Alfonsi
Peter Auriol
Peter of Auvergne
Peter le Bar
Peter of Candia
Peter of Capua the Elder
Peter Ceffons
Peter of Corbeil
Peter Damian
Peter Helias
Peter Lombard
Peter Olivi
Peter of Pisa
Peter of Poitiers (Chancellor)
Peter de Rivo
Peter of Spain (usually identified with Pope John XXI)
Peter the Venerable
Pierre d'Ailly
Pierre de Maricourt
Philip the Chancellor
Plato of Tivoli
Prévostin of Cremona

R 
Radbertus
Radulphus Brito
Radulphus de Longo Campo
Ralph of Beauvais
Ralph Strode
Ramon Lull
Raoul Ardens
Ratramnus
Raymond Féraud
Raymond Gaufredi
Reginald Pecock
Remigius of Auxerre (c. 841–908)
Richard Brinkley
Richard of Campsall
Richard l'Evêque
Richard Fishacre
Richard Ferrybridge
Richard Fitzralph
Richard de Fournival
Richard Kilvington
Richard of Middleton
Richard Rufus of Cornwall
Richard of Saint-Laurent
Richard of St. Victor, (died 1173)
Richard Swineshead
Robert Blund
Robert of Courson
Robert Grosseteste, (c. 1175–1253)
Robert Holcot
Robert Kilwardby, (died 1279)
Robert of Melun
Robert Pullus
Robert de Sorbon, (1201–1274)
Roger Bacon, (1214–1294)
Roger Marston
Roland of Cremona
Roscelin of Compiègne

S 
Servatus Lupus (see Lupus Servatus)
Siger of Brabant, (1240–1284)
Simon of Faversham
Simon of Tournai
Stephen Langton, (c. 1150–1228)
Francisco Suárez, (1548–1617)

T 

Theodore of Tarsus, (602–690)
Theodoric of Freiberg (c.1250 – c.1311)
Theodulf of Orléans, (c. 750/60–821)
Thierry of Chartres/Theodoricus Carnotensis
Thomas Aquinas, (1225–1274)
Thomas Bradwardine, (c. 1290–1349)
Thomas of Chobham
Thomas of Erfurt
Thomas Gallus
Thomas à Kempis, (1380–1471)
Thomas Netter of Walden
Thomas of Sutton
Thomas Wilton

U 
Ulrich of Strassburg
Urso of Salerno

V 
Vital du Four

W 
Walter Burley
Walter Chatton
Walter of Château-Thierry
Walter of Mortagne
William of Alnwick
William of Auvergne
William of Auxerre
William of Champeaux
William of Conches
William of Durham
William of Falagar
William Heytesbury
William of Lucca
William de la Mare
William of Moerbeke
William of Ockham, (c. 1285–1349)
William of Saint-Amour
William of Sherwood
William of Ware
Witelo

Scholastic philosophers